The Health Funding Authority, now defunct, was a New Zealand government entity responsible for funding of public health care in New Zealand between 1997 and 2001. It was formed from the merger of the four Regional Health Authorities (RHAs) as part of the coalition agreement between the New Zealand National Party and New Zealand First following the 1996 general election.

The premise was that a separate purchaser could provide greater efficiency for the health system.

Following the 1999 General Election the new government, left wing New Zealand Labour Party-led coalition set about changing the health system once more; in part due to low public confidence in the health system since the quasi-market reforms attempted earlier in the decade by the previous National Party government.

The HFA was forcibly dissolved by an Act of Parliament, with its purchasing roles picked up by the Ministry of Health and the District Health Boards as part of the new Primary Care Strategy outlined in Labour's 1999 election campaign.

References 

Medical and health organisations based in New Zealand
Government agencies of New Zealand
Defunct organisations based in New Zealand